Kutateladze Institute of Thermophysics  of the Siberian Branch of the Russian Academy of Sciences is a research institute based in Novosibirsk, Russia. It was founded in 1957.

History
The research institute was founded in the Novosibirsk Akademgorodok in 1957.

In 1994, the institute was named after Samson Kutateladze.

Scientific activity
Energy and energy-saving technologies and installations, the theory of heat and mass transfer, physical hydro-gas-dynamics, thermophysical properties of substances, thermophysical aspects of hydrogen energetics.

Magazines
 "Thermophysics and Aeromechanics" («Теплофизика и аэромеханика»)

Bibliography

External links
 Official website.
 Kutateladze Institute of Thermophysics, Siberian Branch of the RAS.
 В Институте теплофизики им. С.С. Кутателадзе СО РАН обсудили новейшие разработки для промышленности. Наука в Сибири.

T
Research institutes in the Soviet Union
Institutes of the Russian Academy of Sciences
Science and technology in Siberia
Research institutes established in 1957
Sovetsky District, Novosibirsk
1957 establishments in the Soviet Union